Ronan Rooney (born March 27, 1960) is an Irish Paralympic athlete in table tennis who has competed in six Paralympic Games.

Career
Born in Louth, Ireland in 1960, he became disabled after falling off a motorbike aged 18.

Formerly he was a track and field athlete who won Bronze in the men's marathon 1B at the 1984 Summer Paralympics. From 1988 onwards he has switched to singles and teams table tennis for Ireland. But not since then has he won another medal.

Ronan made his official return after a 12-year absence from the Paralympics in 2012, playing once again in men's singles and teams. This time, his wife, Rena McCarron Rooney, took part in women's table tennis, and they are believed to be the only married couple competing in the London Paralympics.

References

Paralympic athletes of Ireland
1960 births
Living people
Athletes (track and field) at the 1984 Summer Paralympics
Table tennis players at the 1988 Summer Paralympics
Table tennis players at the 1992 Summer Paralympics
Table tennis players at the 1996 Summer Paralympics
Table tennis players at the 2000 Summer Paralympics
Table tennis players at the 2012 Summer Paralympics
Paralympic bronze medalists for Ireland
Medalists at the 1984 Summer Paralympics
Paralympic medalists in athletics (track and field)
Irish male wheelchair racers